Armando Hernández (born September 27, 1982) is a Mexican television and film actor. He is well known for his main role in El César as Julio César Chávez.

Filmography

Film

Television

References

External links 
 

Living people
Mexican male television actors
21st-century Mexican male actors
1984 births